Lorenzo 1997 – L'albero is the seventh studio album by Italian singer-songwriter Jovanotti, released by Mercury Records on 30 January 1997.

Track listing

Charts and certifications

Charts

Certifications

References

1997 albums
Jovanotti albums
Mercury Records albums
Italian-language albums